Enaphalodes hispicornis is a species of beetle in the family Cerambycidae. It was described by Carl Linnaeus in his 12th edition of Systema Naturae 1767.

References

Elaphidiini
Beetles described in 1767
Taxa named by Carl Linnaeus